The Women's team at the 2004 Summer Olympics as part of the archery programme were held at the Panathinaiko Stadium.

The women's team archery was held on 20 August, after all of the individual competition had finished but before the men's team competition.

Records

216 arrow ranking round

27 arrow match

Ranking round
The team ranking round consisted merely of summing the scores of the team's three competitors from the individual ranking round.

Competition bracket

References

Women's team
2004 in women's archery
Women's events at the 2004 Summer Olympics